The Classified was a progressive rock band formed in California in 1984, whose foremost player was the famous guitarist Steve Vai on guitar and vocals. It also included:
Stu Hamm - bass, vocals
Tommy Mars - keyboards, vocals
Sue Mathis - keys and vox
Mike Barsimanto - drums
Chris Frazier - drums

The band never released any commercial recordings, though concert tapes exist.

References

Musical groups from California
Musical groups established in 1984
American progressive rock groups